Thomas Ian Pauling  (born 13 December 1946) is an Australian lawyer and a former Administrator of the Northern Territory.

Career
Born in Sydney, Pauling was educated at Drummoyne Boys' High School, and graduated with a Bachelor of Laws (LLB) from the Sydney Law School (Syd). He was admitted to the Bar in New South Wales in 1969, and worked for the NSW Public Solicitor. In March 1970, he moved to Darwin in the Northern Territory, where he practised as a barrister and lived in Fannie Bay.

He was made a Queen's Counsel (QC) in 1984, and was Solicitor-General of the Northern Territory from 1988 to 2007.

In September 2007, he was appointed Administrator of the Northern Territory, replacing Ted Egan. He was sworn in by the Governor-General of Australia, Michael Jeffery, on 9 November 2007. His term expired on 31 October 2011 when Sally Thomas was sworn in as the first female Administrator of the Northern Territory.

In the Queen's Birthday Honours of 2008, Pauling was appointed an Officer of the Order of Australia for his significant services to the Northern Territory.

References

External links
Website of the Northern Territory Administrator

1946 births
Living people
Administrators of the Northern Territory
Solicitors-General of the Northern Territory
Australian barristers
University of Sydney alumni
Officers of the Order of Australia
Knights of Grace of the Order of St John
Australian King's Counsel